Eucalyptus aquilina, commonly known as the Mount Le Grand mallee, is a mallee that is endemic to a small area in the south-west of Western Australia. It has smooth white and grey bark, lance-shaped, often curved leaves, top-shaped or diamond-shaped flower buds, white to cream-coloured flowers and cone-shaped fruit on a down-curved peduncle.

Description
The leaves on young plants and on coppice regrowth are lance-shaped to egg-shaped and a slightly different shade of green on the two sides. Flowering occurs between April and October and the flowers are white to cream coloured.

Taxonomy and naming
Eucalyptus aquilina was first formally described in 1974 by Ian Brooker from a specimen collected near Cape Le Grand and the description was published in the journal Nuytsia. The specific epithet (aquilina) is a Latin word meaning "of eagles", referring to the eagle-like lobes on the fruit.

Distribution and habitat
The Mount Le Grand mallee grows in shallow valleys, creek beds and hillsides in a small area in the Cape Le Grand National Park along the south coast, east of Esperance. It grows in dense heath in shallow soils over granite.

Conservation
This eucalypt is classified as "Priority Four" by the Government of Western Australia Department of Parks and Wildlife, meaning that is rare or near threatened.

See also

List of Eucalyptus species

References

aquilina
Endemic flora of Western Australia
Mallees (habit)
Myrtales of Australia
Eucalypts of Western Australia
Goldfields-Esperance
Plants described in 1974
Taxa named by Ian Brooker